Accelerator is the seventh studio album by  Royal Trux. It was originally released on Drag City in 1998. It peaked at number 32 on the UK Independent Albums Chart.

Critical reception

Stephen Thomas Erlewine of AllMusic gave the album 4.5 stars out of 5, saying, "Royal Trux have rarely had both their songwriting and noise under control like they do here, and the result is pure dynamite -- possibly their best album to date."

NME named it the 8th best album of 1998. Pitchfork placed it at number 29 on the "50 Best Albums of 1998" list.

At Metacritic, which assigns a weighted average score out of 100 to reviews from mainstream critics, the album's 2012 reissue received an average score of 83 out of 100 based on 10 reviews, indicating "universal acclaim".

Track listing

Personnel
Credits adapted from liner notes.
 Jennifer Herrema – vocals, recording, mixing
 Neil Hagerty – vocals, guitar, bass guitar, keyboards, MIDI, tin whistle, kazoo, harmonica, percussion, recording, mixing
 Ken Nasta – drums, percussion
 Timothy McClain – synthesizer
 Rian Murphy – chorus vocals
 Paul Oldham – live sound recording
 Konrad Strauss – pre-mastering
 Howie Weinberg – mastering
 Dan Osborn – layout
 Patsy Desmond – photography
 Dan Koretzky – special operations

Charts

References

External links
 

1998 albums
Royal Trux albums
Drag City (record label) albums
Domino Recording Company albums